Casino M8trix is a cardroom in San Jose, California. The 8-story casino offers table games and a poker room.  Founded in 1946 under the name Garden City Casino, the casino secured one of the 15 card room licenses in San Jose.

The casino has been involved with charity programs such as Second Harvest Food Bank and HERS Breast Cancer Foundation.

In 2014, the casino was accused of hiding profits and could lose its gaming license if convicted.

See also
 List of casinos in California

References

External links

Casinos in California
Culture of San Jose, California
Buildings and structures in San Jose, California
Casinos completed in the 20th century